Colin Troup Moodie (5 April 19136 February 2000) was an Australian public servant and diplomat.

Life and career
Moodie was born on 5 April 1913 in Wollstonecraft, New South Wales. In 1920, when Moodie was seven, he and his family moved to Adelaide so that Moodie's father could take a bank manager role.

Moodie was educated at St Peter's College, Adelaide, achieving a scholarship to St. Mark's College at the University of Adelaide after being named dux of his class. Moodie graduated from the university in 1934 with a Bachelor of Laws.

He began a legal career and was associate to Herbert Angas Parsons before resigning in 1937 to take up an appointment at the Department of External Affairs as a clerk.

In 1944 Moodie was appointed official secretary to the first Australian High Commissioner to India Iven Mackay. Moodie was one of several officers responsible for setting up the new mission in Delhi.

Moodie was appointed Australia's first Minister to Burma in 1954.

From 1972 to 1975, Moodie was Australian Ambassador to South Africa.

Moodie died in Adelaide on 6 February 2000.

References

1913 births
2000 deaths
Ambassadors of Australia to Myanmar
Ambassadors of Australia to the Netherlands
High Commissioners of Australia to New Zealand
High Commissioners of Australia to South Africa
High Commissioners of Australia to Botswana
University of Adelaide alumni